Irish Theological Quarterly is a quarterly peer-reviewed academic journal that publishes systematic, moral, and historical theology as well as sacred scripture. It was established by Walter McDonald and Dr. John Harty in 1906, published by M.H. Gill & Son in Dublin, but ceased publication after his death. A new series was started in 1951. It is published by SAGE Publications on behalf of St Patrick's College, Maynooth.

Editors 
The editor-in-chief since 2013 is Declan Marmion SM, dean of the faculty of theology at St Patrick's College, Maynooth. Previous editors have included John Harty, James MacCaffrey, M.J. O'Donnell, Martin O'Callaghan, and Vincent Twomey SVD (1997-2006). Bishop William Philbin for a time, served as a joint-editor of the journal.

Contributors 
Contributors to the Irish Theological Quarterly, include Thomas L. Brodie OP, Brian Davies OP, John Navone SJ, Thomas O'Loughlin and Janet E. Smith. Many other theologians and philosophers, and figures in the church have contributed articles to the journal, Bishop Thomas Gilmartin, Enda McDonagh and Hugh Pope OP. Review editors are Maynooth lecturers, church historian Professor Salvador Ryan was appointed in 2015 and Liam Tracey OSM.

Abstracting and indexing 
The journal is abstracted and indexed in ATLA Religion Database, Scopus, and ZETOC.

References

External links 
 

St Patrick's College, Maynooth
SAGE Publishing academic journals
English-language journals
Quarterly journals
Christianity studies journals
Publications established in 1906
1906 establishments in Ireland